The Georgetown–UConn men's basketball rivalry is an American college basketball rivalry between the UConn Huskies men's basketball team of the University of Connecticut and Georgetown Hoyas men's basketball team of Georgetown University. The all-time series is tied 36–36.

History
The first game played between the two schools took place on December 22, 1958, in Storrs, Connecticut. Connecticut won 76–68.

The rivalry peaked while both teams were members of the original Big East Conference from 1979 to 2013. The two schools each won a record seven Big East tournaments during those years.

In 2013, Georgetown left the original Big East to join a new Big East Conference, while UConn remained behind in the old conference, which became the American Athletic Conference. The two schools met in non-conference games in 2016 and 2017. UConn moved to the new Big East Conference for the 2020-2021 season, renewing the rivalry within the Big East which, like the American Athletic Conference, claims the history and heritage of the original Big East as its own.

Connecticut last beat the Hoyas 68–62 on February 4, 2023. Georgetown last beat the Huskies with a score of 72–69 on January 14, 2017. Both of the games were played in Washington, D.C.

Game results

References 

UConn Huskies men's basketball
Georgetown Hoyas men's basketball
College basketball rivalries in the United States